This is a list of flag bearers who have represented British Virgin Islands at the Olympics.

Flag bearers carry the national flag of their country at the opening ceremony of the Olympic Games.

See also
British Virgin Islands at the Olympics

References

British Virgin Islands at the Olympics
British Virgin Islands
Olympic